Thierry Casasnovas is a controversial figure from the French world of alternative health.  Without medical training, he gives advice on health and nutrition on the web, and he is a prolific videographer, author of several hundred videos on YouTube. Some practices that he advises are considered without a scientific basis or even dangerous for health by dieticians and doctors.

Scientists, medias, or associative organizations like the UNADFI tend, directly or indirectly, to link some of the controversial theories that he is spreading—without any officially recognized medical training—with a veiled form of charlatanism.

Nicknamed "the guru of raw food", the same authorities also mentioned possible prospects of sectarian drifts. They also pointed out the risks and dangers resulting from nutritional deficiencies relating to the strict and exclusive veganism which he is advocating.  In view of the above, the members of the MIVILUDES declared that they have received several hundred reports from the parents of followers worried about the fate and health of their relatives, many of whom claiming that they were deliberately giving up any conventional medical approach in favor of the sole teachings provided by Thierry Casasnovas. The aforesaid reports focused in particular on the fact that the allegedly curative treatments recommended by him are essentially limited to the sole absorption of freshly squeezed vegetable juices together with a raw food diet—strictly based on a vegan nutrition—punctuated by interspersed fasting periods of extensible duration.

In the summer of 2020, the Paris public prosecutor's office opened an investigation into his case on the grounds of potential endangerment and "suspected fraudulent abuse of vulnerable persons". Thierry Casasnovas is refuting all the accusations against him, invoking his freedom of speech.

He claims to have recovered himself from various pathological conditions such as tuberculosis or hepatitis C by adopting a raw and living diet.

During the COVID-19 pandemic, he spread conspiracy theories and misinformation about the disease.

References 

1974 births
French YouTubers
French veganism activists
Food and cooking YouTubers
Health and fitness YouTubers
YouTube channels launched in 2010
Pseudoscientific diet advocates
Alternative cancer treatment advocates
Alternative detoxification promoters
Fasting advocates
French health and wellness writers
French nutritionists
Naturopaths
Raw foodists
Vitalists
Living people
YouTube controversies